RockNess 2007 was the second RockNess Festival to take place. the festival was increased to two days, had additional stages and capacity was increased to 35,000. Headlining on Saturday were the Chemical Brothers, while Sunday was headlined by Manic Street Preachers on the main stage and Daft Punk in the Clash Arena. Other notable acts included The Charlatans, Groove Armada, The Feeling, and Soulwax playing Nite Versions.

Daft Punk were much more popular than expected and the 10,000 person Clash tent was soon filled, the sides were removed by organisers to allow a reported 30,000 people to see the set. In addition the Daft Punk set was initially held up by nearly an hour due to lighting problems. Daft Punk responded to this by playing an uncharacteristic 10-minute encore, as found on the Alive 2007 album.

The festival management were criticised for their decision to place Daft Punk in the 10,000 capacity Clash Arena instead of the mainstage. The festival was Daft Punks first Scottish show in over 10 years which made the set a "must see" for many of the 35,000 festival goers.

There was also some controversy with the death of one festival goer from taking an overdose of heroin in the car park outside the main arena and camp site.

Professional footballer Richie Hart who plays for Inverness Caledonian Thistle was detained in connection with possession of cocaine on the banks of Loch Ness at the 2007 festival. He admitted to the charge of possessing cocaine and was fined £300.

Line-up
The line-up was as follows.

References

2007
2007 in Scotland
2007 in British music
2007 music festivals
June 2007 events in the United Kingdom